G-Police is a 1997 combat flight simulation video game developed and published by Psygnosis for PlayStation and Microsoft Windows.

The game has a science fiction setting inspired by Blade Runner. This story goes on during 2097, on a colonised Callisto. The game charts the protagonist Slater's attempts to discover the truth behind his sister's mysterious death while working for the titular G-Police. The game begins with the G-Police combating organised criminals before fighting the private armies of powerful corporations in an unfolding conspiracy-themed plot. The gameplay involves piloting VTOL aircraft resembling helicopters, engaging in combat with enemies and protecting allies.

The game made use of cutting edge technology such as force-feedback joysticks and controllers, 3D sound and Direct3D Hardware Acceleration. Critics noted that the game's graphics were some of the most technically impressive of the time, and that this resulted in poor draw distance; the PlayStation version in particular struggled in this respect. The gameplay was more favourably reviewed, with critics praising the solid pacing and variety of mission objectives, though there were complaints regarding poor controls and unfairly high difficulty.

Gameplay

G-Police is a shooter game in which the player pilots a VTOL aircraft, described by critics as "jet helicopters" or "a helicopter without the rotors". The player can choose to view the action from a variety of first- or third-person perspectives, including views from within the cockpit, a variety of "chase" perspectives, including directly from above the craft (for use when bombing). Combat in G-Police involves both dogfighting with other aircraft and dropping bombs. The player is often required to "scan" suspect vehicles to determine if they are criminal or hostile.

The game's aircraft comes with numerous weapons which are upgraded as the player progresses to more difficult levels. An improved version of the basic "Havoc Gunship" aircraft (the "Venom Gunship") is also available later in the game. Missions include seeking out and destroying enemies, escorting friendly ground units, preventing smuggling and bomb disposal. The player receives updates and new instructions as the mission proceeds. The main game mode features 35 missions and an additional training mode. Most of the game's missions take place in urban "domes" filled with large buildings; some, however, take place in the "outer domes", with other themes such as agrarian settings.

Synopsis

Setting
As this game is set during year 2097, according to the introductory sequence, a sequence also provides the history of this game's setting: during year 2057, the depletion of Earth's resources coincided with widening space exploration. After a catastrophic war over ever-declining resources, ending 10 years prior to the events of G-Police, Earth's governments were stripped of military power. As a result, powerful corporations had exerted control over Earth and the burgeoning space colonies. The Government Police (G-Police) was formed by Earth's remaining coalition government to maintain order in these colonies.

In the latter part of the introductory sequence, Slater, the game's protagonist, introduces himself as a war veteran who had joined the G-Police to conduct his own investigation of his sister Elaine's apparent suicide, suspecting that she was murdered. He also provides his view of the G-Police, stating they lack authority and "turn a blind eye" to "shady corporate deals" while attempting to maintain order. He describes the Havoc gun-ships as outdated and the pilots as a mixture of desperate war veterans and naïve idealists.

Plot

The early levels of the game depict Slater combating enemy gangs. The G-Police suspect "Krakov" corporation is supplying the gangs with weaponry. Krakov's president however is subsequently the subject of an assassination attempt by the gangs. During this attempt, Hiroshi Tachikawaa pilot whom Slater describes as flying his gun-ship "like he was born in it"dies when his gun-ship crashes after mysteriously malfunctioning. In the interests of morale, his death is covered up; Slater notes this incident is reminiscent of Elaine's death.

After numerous insurgencies, invasions, and terrorism, on these personnel and property, Krakov blames a rival corporation, "Nanosoft", and begins openly attacking them with its private army. Lacking evidence for involvement with the criminal gangs, the G-Police protect Nanosoft, ultimately destroying Krakov's military power. The G-Police, however, investigate exactly why Krakov and Nanosoft were fighting. The latter half of the game depicts a conflict between the G-Police and Nanosoft's private forces, which attack G-Police after Krakov's collapse, both out of panic as to the investigation and to tie up loose ends.

In the unfolding plot, the player learns that Tachikawa and Elaine were killed (by the sabotage of their gun-ships) to procure microchips implanted in their brains. These chips can record a pilot's knowledge and combat skills; Nanosoft desired them to power the artificial intelligence in their weapons. The G-Police commander Horton is assassinated by Slater's traitorous wingman Ricardo, also to this end. The game ends with the destruction of a large spacecraft by Slater; the closing sequence reveals that Nanosoft had planned to use this to exert military dominance over other corporations.

Development
According to Ian Hetherington, the co-founder of Psygnosis, G-Police was developed by one of company's "microstudios" in Stroud. This studio consisted of around 70 people and was also responsible for developing Overboard! at the same time.

G-Police was backed by a reported $2.5 million advertising campaign, part of a wider $6 million campaign which also included Formula 1 Championship Edition and Colony Wars. According to Psygnosis product marketing manager Mark Day, G-Police and Colony Wars were "neck and neck" as far as getting the biggest financial push from the company. They partnered with the Diesel clothing company—added to the game as an evil corporation whose logo could be blown up—who designed the police's uniform and produced their jacket as a limited edition piece.

A television advertisement was created to publicise the game, based around an animated sequence by Peter Chung, creator of Æon Flux. The original sequence was 21 seconds long, but was shortened to allow gameplay footage to appear in the advertisement. The animation was "done entirely using traditional hand-drawn methods", according to its creator. Regarding its development, Chung also stated:  Chung claimed that the decision to "concentrate on the people inside the machines" was informed by his belief that the game's plot, setting and characters set G-Police apart from other shooters of the day.

Reception

G-Police received mixed to positive reviews. Upon its original release for the PlayStation, critics were impressed by the full motion video custscenes and elaborate cityscapes, but were derisive of the low draw distance. GamePro described it as "one of the worst cases of draw-in since 32-bit gaming began", reckoning that "About a third of the screen remains black while buildings and enemies wink into existence." However, while GamePro judged this a crippling flaw, most critics assessed that the game is exemplary in spite of it. IGN said the graphics are the "low point of the game", which was redeemed by solid gameplay and attention to detail. IGN, Edge, and Shawn Smith and Crispin Boyer of Electronic Gaming Monthly all argued that the low draw distance was an easily forgivable shortcoming given the limitations of the PlayStation. Edge praised the large city environments, flight simulation (noting the support for analog joypads), "marvellous" cut scenes and "great variety and imagination" of the playable missions.

The controls were a point of disagreement. GameSpot, GamePro, and Dan Hsu and Crispin Boyer of EGM all said that the game controls poorly whether using analog or digital controllers. Hsu elaborated, "Analog is too sensitive; digital is too clunky. Poor control+speedy gameplay+lots of buildings=a disaster (and one slightly frustrated reviewer). But it's no big deal; I still recommend it highly." GameSpots Joe Fielder was less forgiving, saying the control issues "prevent [G-Police] from having speedy arcade-style play or, in effect, acting as a compelling action title." On the contrary, Hsu's co-reviewer Kelly Rickards and IGN both contended that the initially difficult controls become natural with practice. While Fielder derided the missions as being repetitive, most critics praised their broad variety of objectives and exciting pace.

Both Edge and its American sister magazine Next Generation wrote that the PlayStation version's problems with draw distance and frame rate were solved in the PC version, albeit only when using high-end hardware. Next Generation praised the game's support of recent technical innovations, particularly force–feedback joysticks, 3D sound, and Direct3D Hardware Acceleration. The magazine also praised the graphics (again noting the scifi influence), responsive controls and enjoyable gameplay, but the reviewer complained that the game became overly difficult after the first few missions and that the verbal instructions were easily missed. Edge called it "a meeting of envelope-pushing code and solid gameplay". Mark East argued in GameSpot that while the PC version of G-Police is "quite possibly the best looking game to hit the scene since the advent of 3D-accelerator cards", the unintuitive controls, "downright ludicrous" level of difficulty, and the fact that those who cannot afford a high-end PC setup cannot even enjoy the game's visual merits make it not worth buying.

G-Police was a runner-up for Computer Gaming Worlds 1997 "Action Game of the Year" award, which ultimately went to Quake II. The editors called G-Police "the most beautiful" action nominee that year, but wrote that it lost its chance due to the lack of multiplayer gameplay.

Sequel

G-Police: Weapons of Justice is the sequel to G-Police, released in 1999 for the PlayStation. The game depicts the aftermath of the conflict between the G-Police and Nanosoft, which involves initial battles with gangs attempting to take advantage of the colony's instability. Later, another war arises between the G-Police and a power hungry leader of Earth's forces, originally sent to assist the G-Police against the gangs. The game features additional vehicles: a VTOL spacecraft, an armoured personnel carrier and the "Raptor"—a mech with the ability to leap airborne. The game received similar reviews to the original game: IGN praised its well-crafted gameplay, story and sound, while GameSpot considered the controls awkward and the missions and setting repetitive. The graphics again received a mixed reception: IGN praised the attention to detail but criticised the poor draw distance, as did GameSpot.

In 2001, a rumoured sequel for the PlayStation 2 was reported. The rumours later proved false. While Sony contemplated the notion of a G-Police game for the PlayStation 2, they decided that, because G-Police was not as successful as other games, Psygnosis (which had since been renamed Studio Liverpool) would instead concentrate on the Formula 1 and Wipeout franchises. Furthermore, the development team responsible for G-Police and Weapons of Justice had moved on to other ventures. In 2007, G-Police was made available for download on PlayStation 3. Computer and Video Games noted that the graphics looked poor by current standards but deemed it still enjoyable to play.

Trivia
Peter Chung with Acme Filmworks animated a anime-style sakuga short commercial for the game.

References

External links

1997 video games
Fiction set on Callisto (moon)
Combat flight simulators
Cyberpunk video games
Helicopter video games
PlayStation (console) games
Psygnosis games
Single-player video games
Sony Interactive Entertainment franchises
Sony Interactive Entertainment games
Video games about police officers
Video games set in the 2090s
Windows games
Video games developed in the United Kingdom